Yasmine Hanani (born June 5, 1980) is an  American actress.

Hanani was born in Baltimore and grew up in Southfield, Michigan and later in Orange County, Southern California. Hanani has worked on documentaries "Voices of Iraq,". "My Country, My Country" and "The Blood of My Brother".

Recent roles include performances in Peter Berg's The Kingdom (2007) and  Nick Broomfield's "Battle for Haditha" (2008).

Filmography
Battle for Haditha (2008)
The Kingdom (2007)
Kemo Sabe (2007)
Looking for Comedy in the Muslim World (2005)
Spartan (2004)

References

External links

1980 births
American film actresses
American television actresses
Actresses from Michigan
Living people
People from Southfield, Michigan
21st-century American women
Chaldean Americans